Monochoria korsakowii is a species of flowering plant in the water hyacinth family known by several common names, including heartleaf false pickerelweed and oval-leafed pondweed.

It is native to east Asia.

Pontederiaceae
Aquatic plants
Invasive plant species in Sri Lanka